Dieing may refer to:

 A common misspelling of dying
 A misspelling of dyeing
 Using a die (manufacturing)